Operation Sunrise may refer to:
Operation Sunrise (World War II), a series of secret negotiations in March 1945 in Switzerland between elements of the Nazi German SS and the U.S. Office of Strategic Services under Allen Dulles
Operation Sunrise (Nyasaland), mass detentions which marked the first stage in a State of Emergency declared on March 3, 1959
Operation Sunrise (Vietnam War), a 1962 test of the Strategic Hamlet Program
Operation Sunrise (Albania), part of the 1997 rebellion in Albania
Operation Sunrise, a 2006 approach to the hyperinflation of banknotes of Zimbabwe
Siege of Lal Masjid, code-named Operation Sunrise, a confrontation in July 2007 between Islamic fundamentalist militants and the government of Pakistan
 Operation Sunrise, 2019, a joint army operation by India and Myanmar targeting insurgency in North East India